Goran Jerković may refer to:

 Goran Jerković (footballer, born 1965), retired football midfielder from Croatia
 Goran Jerković (footballer, born 1986), French football player